What Really Happens in Thailand is an Australian reality documentary television series that airs on the Seven Network.

The program was first announced at the network's upfronts in 2014. The series is a spin-off of the 2014 program What Really Happens in Bali and produced by the same production company McAvoy Media. The series films the activities and situations of Australian tourists and expats in various locations throughout Thailand, including nightclubs, hospitals and cosmetic surgery centres.

Broadcast
The series premiered in Australia on the Seven Network on 14 September 2015, airing on Monday nights until the fifth episode of the series, when the show was moved to Thursday nights. After episode six, the series was pulled from the schedule until the television non-ratings period, when episode seven premiered on a Tuesday night however it did not reach the top 20 most watched programs for the first time in the program's season.

Episodes

Spin-off
A second spin-off of the format followed in 2016, titled What Really Happens on the Gold Coast.

References

Seven Network original programming
2015 Australian television series debuts
Australian factual television series
English-language television shows
Television shows set in Thailand
Australian television spin-offs